The Midwest Zodiac Talon-Turbine is an American helicopter that was designed and produced by Midwest Engineering & Design of Overland Park, Kansas. When it was available the aircraft was supplied in the form of plans for amateur construction, but the plans are no longer advertised for sale.

Design and development
The Zodiac Talon-Turbine was designed to comply with the US Experimental - Amateur-built aircraft rules. It features a single  diameter two-bladed main rotor, a two-bladed tail rotor, a two-seats-in side-by-side configuration enclosed cockpit with a bubble canopy, and skid-type landing gear.

Rotor dynamic components can be sourced from commercially produced products for other helicopter models, including the Hughes 300, Robinson R22 and Rotorway Exec.

The aircraft fuselage is made from a combination of steel, aluminum and composite material.

The manufacturer estimated the construction time from the plans as 1100 hours.

Operational history
By 1998 the company reported that 400 sets of plans had been sold and 15 aircraft were completed and flying. The prototype was reported to have 1200 hours on it flying overseas in the agricultural aircraft role.

By March 2015 no examples had been registered in the United States with the Federal Aviation Administration.

Specifications (Zodiac Talon-Turbine)

See also
List of rotorcraft

References

Zodiac Talon-Turbine
1990s United States sport aircraft
1990s United States helicopters
Homebuilt aircraft
Single-turbine helicopters